Lecozotan is an investigational drug by Wyeth tested for improvement of cognitive functions of Alzheimer's disease patients.
, the first Phase III clinical trial has been completed.

Method of action 

Lecozotan is a competitive, selective 5-HT1A receptor antagonist which enhances the potassium-stimulated release of acetylcholine and glutamate.

References 

5-HT1A antagonists
Antidementia agents
2-Pyridyl compounds
Nitriles
Eltoprazines
Benzamides